The Santa Cruz Beach Boardwalk is an oceanfront amusement park in Santa Cruz, California. Founded in 1907, it is California's oldest surviving amusement park and one of the few seaside parks on the West Coast of the United States.

Description 

The boardwalk extends along the coast of the Monterey Bay, from just east of the Santa Cruz Municipal Wharf to the mouth of the San Lorenzo River. At the western edge of the park lies a large building originally known as The Plunge, now Neptune's Kingdom, a pirate-themed recreation center which contains a video arcade and an indoor miniature golf course. Next to this is the Casino Fun Center which includes a laser tag arena and next to that is the Cocoanut Grove banquet room and conference center. A Laffing Sal automated character, from San Francisco's Playland, is viewable near the miniature golf course.

East of the casino, the boardwalk portion of the park stretches along a wide, sandy Main Beach visitors can access easily from the park. The eastern end of the boardwalk is dominated by the Giant Dipper, a wooden roller coaster that is one of the most visible landmarks in Santa Cruz. The Dipper and the Looff Carousel, which still contains its original 342-pipe organ built in 1894, are both on the US National Register of Historic Places. They were, together, declared to be a National Historic Landmark in 1987 and the park is California Historical Landmark number 983.

There are old-fashioned carnival games and snack booths throughout the  park.

History

Fred W. Swanton formed the Santa Cruz Beach, Cottage, and Tent City Corporation in 1903 and the following year, the City of Santa Cruz granted permission for commercial buildings to be built. On 14 June 1904, the Neptune Casino opened with an arcade, grill and dining room, and a theater.

The beach was a destination for railroads and trolleys from 1875. From 1927 to 1959, Southern Pacific Railroad ran Suntan Special excursion trains to the beach from San Francisco, Oakland, and San Jose every summer Sunday and holiday. A short passenger service to Henry Cowell Redwoods State Park was restored in 1985. The Santa Cruz, Big Trees and Pacific Railway stops in front of the park.

, the park is headed by Charles Canfield, the son of Laurence Canfield, the president of the park from the 1950s until the early 1980s. It has won the Best Seaside Amusement Park Award from Amusement Today every year since 2007 except for 2015. Although there is no admission and the beach is public, parking is charged a fee when the rides are open. Season or day passes can be purchased or tickets for $1; each ride costs between 3 and 7 tickets.

Due to the COVID-19 pandemic, the park shut down in mid-March 2020. The park reopened on November 7, 2020. The park then subsequently shut down on November 10, 2020, due to Santa Cruz County re-entering the Substantial tier of the California Blueprint for a Safer Economy. The park then re-opened select rides to California residents on April 1, 2021.

Boardwalk's Cocoanut Grove
The Boardwalk's Cocoanut Grove conference center includes banquet rooms and a performing arts venue. Food, drink, and theater were profitable aspects of the resort since the original Casino of Swanton in 1904. Although gambling was never legal, it was generally known that guests could take boats from the "pleasure pier" to a ship in the harbor to play games of chance in the early days. During Prohibition from 1920 to 1933, serving alcoholic drinks was also outlawed and the casino changed its name to Cocoanut Grove. The name includes an old spelling of Coconut, Cocos nucifera, which was used in the popular Marx Brothers movie The Cocoanuts of 1929. The name was also used by a number of popular nightclubs of the era, including one in The Ambassador Hotel in Los Angeles, California.

In the 1930s and 1940s, Cocoanut Grove was a popular spot for major big band acts, including Stan Kenton, Benny Goodman, Lionel Hampton and Tommy Dorsey.

Today, Cocoanut Grove rarely hosts musical acts. It is a venue for weddings, banquets, school formal occasions and reunions, and corporate events.

Rides

Current roller coasters

Thrill rides

Family rides

Kiddie rides

Former rides
Hurricane (replaced by Undertow)
Videostorm (replaced by Tsunami)
Whirlwind
Chaos
Paratrooper
Wave Jammer (opened 1986, replaced by Rock & Roll)
Bermuda Triangle (Scrambler)
Spider
Spin Out (Tea Cups)
Artic Flyer (opened 1973, replaced by Videostorm)
Wild Mouse (closed 1975, replaced by Logger's Revenge)
Crazy Surf (KMG X-Factory), Sold to UK showman Joseph Manning in October 2018, converted from park to travelling model by Eagle Fabrications.

References

Further reading

External links

Cocoanut Grove Official site

 
San Francisco Bay Area amusement parks
Seaside resorts in California
1907 establishments in California
Amusement parks in California
Santa Cruz, California
History of Santa Cruz County, California
Buildings and structures in Santa Cruz County, California
Tourist attractions in Santa Cruz County, California
Landmarks in California